Alan Walker may refer to:

Allan Walker (footballer) (born 1986), Scottish footballer
Allan S. Walker (1887–1958), Australian Army officer and medical historian

See also
Alan Walker (disambiguation)
Allen Walker, a fictional character from D.Gray-man manga and anime series